Ambrose "Amblin' Amby" Schindler (April 21, 1917 – December 30, 2018) was an American collegiate football player, coach, and on-field official. He played college football for the University of Southern California.

Sports career
Schindler prepped at San Diego High School.  A star quarterback for the USC Trojans, during the 1937 season he led the team in rushing, scoring and total offense and was named to all-conference honors.  His senior year, he led the Trojans to a share of the 1939 national championship: At the 1940 Rose Bowl, capping the 1939 season, Schindler ran for a touchdown and passed for another in a 14-0 victory over a Tennessee Volunteers team that had previously gone undefeated for 23 games and unscored upon for the previous 16 games (including the entire 1939 regular season); he was named the game's most valuable player.  He went on to be the MVP in the 1940 College All-Star Game, held at Soldier Field in Chicago.

Film and stunt work
During the end of his college career, he appeared in The Wizard of Oz (1939) as a Winkie guard and as Jack Haley's Tin Man stunt double. At the time of his death, Schindler was one of the last surviving living people working on the film classic. He also appeared in Sailor's Lady (1940).

Later sport career and honours
Although selected by the Green Bay Packers in the 1940 draft, Schindler did not play in the National Football League.  At the time, coaching at high school and college offered more financial security than the low pay NFL of the early 1940s; he would later admit that he had lifelong doubts about his decision. His first offer out of college was to coach at Glendale High School, so chose it over a professional career.  He served in the Navy during World War II and returned to move into a long career as coach and instructor at El Camino College in Torrance, California.  In addition, Schindler also was a longtime football game official, working for years in the American Football League and later officiating high school and college games. He was inducted into the San Diego Hall of Champions Breitbard Hall of Fame in 1973.  He was inducted into the USC Athletic Hall of Fame in 1997, and the Rose Bowl Hall of Fame in 2002.

Personal life
Schindler was one of three children born to Charles Anthony Schindler (1880–1961) and Nellie Ethel Parks (1880–1957).  Schindler married his wife, Lucille Frances West (1917–1984), on August 29, 1943, and they together had two children.  He did occasionally think about what his life would have been like if he played professional football, but part of his decision to select a more, at the time, stable career was because of his wife. His descendants noted that Schindler had suffered several concussions during his college career and that his short-term memory during his 90s had deteriorated rapidly compared to his sister's at a similar age; thus not going professional as a football player may have spared him from worse chronic traumatic encephalopathy. Schindler loved surfing and bicycling and was an active surfer until age 75.  He drove a Jaguar with a vanity license plate reading "X USC QB." He turned 100 in April 2017 and died in December 2018 of undisclosed causes at the age of 101.

See also
 List of American Football League officials

References

External links
 

1917 births
2018 deaths
American centenarians
American Football League officials
American football quarterbacks
College football officials
El Camino College faculty
Green Bay Packers players
Male actors from San Diego
Players of American football from San Diego
USC Trojans football players
Men centenarians
United States Navy personnel of World War II
San Diego High School alumni